Nancy Schreiber (born June 27, 1949) is an American cinematographer known for her work on Chain of Desire, Dead Beat, The Celluloid Closet, November, and The Nines.

Early life and education 
Nancy Schreiber was born on June 27, 1949 in Detroit, Michigan. Her mother was a docent and art dealer. Although her father died when she was young, he sparked Schreiber's interest in film as he was into photography, mainly using 8mm and 16mm film. In an interview, Schreiber said that Lawrence of Arabia had the biggest influence on her when she was younger. Schreiber studied at the University of Michigan, graduating with a dual degree in Psychology and History of art. During her time at university, she took some photography classes and ran the film society's theatre in Ann Arbor. After she graduated, she took a two-month film course in New York City, which was what started her film career.

Career 
Nancy Schreiber's first job was as a production assistant, which she got by replying to an ad in a newspaper. By the end of the film shoot, she became a part of the electrical crew and was the best boy of the department. After this, she began to work in the electrical department in many commercials and films. Her first job as a Director of Photography was for a low-budget Western film. As well as working on films and TV shows, Schreiber has worked on music videos, including musicians like Aretha Franklin and Van Morrison. Many American and international cinematographers have influenced Schreiber, the main ones including Sven Nykvist, Vittorio Storaro, Eduardo Serra, and Emmanuel Lubezki. During the 1990s, Schreiber was an adjunct professor at the American Film Institute and taught advanced cinematography. Outside of these cinematographers, Rembrandt, Vincent van Gogh, Ingmar Bergman, Sergei Eisenstein, and the French New Wave movement have influenced her. Schreiber became a member of NABET and was the first female gaffer to do so. In 1995, she became an official member of the American Society of Cinematographers and was the fourth woman to join it. Schreiber has been on two film festival juries, the Sundance Dramatic Jury and the AFI Film Festival Jury. Throughout her career, Schreiber has been on the Board of Governors of the American Society of Cinematographers, a board member of the Women in Film Foundation, and a member of the Academy of Motion Picture Arts and Sciences.

Selected filmography

Awards

References 

1949 births
Living people
Artists from Detroit
American women cinematographers
University of Michigan College of Literature, Science, and the Arts alumni
American cinematographers
21st-century American women